"(Marie's the Name) His Latest Flame" is a song recorded in a hit version by Elvis Presley and published by Elvis Presley Music in 1961. It was written by Doc Pomus and Mort Shuman and first recorded by Del Shannon on the album Runaway With Del Shannon, which was released in June 1961.

Elvis Presley recording
The more successful and well-known recording by Elvis Presley was released in August 1961. The relatively intense tune, featuring a Bo Diddley beat, performed well on both pop and easy listening stations, reaching No. 4 on the Billboard Hot 100, and No. 2 on the Easy Listening chart, based (at the time) on the Top 100. However, the single's Hot 100 chart run was atypical of a Top Ten hit. In the autumn of 1961 it shot from 22 to 4, then dropped to 10, then 26, all within the space of four weeks. The single (a double A-side with "Little Sister", as in the States) spent four weeks at No. 1 on the UK Singles Chart — one of Presley's nine UK chart-toppers between 1960 and 1962.

Personnel

Recorded in RCA Studio B, Nashville, Tennessee, June 26, 1961
 Scotty Moore, Neal Matthews Jr. – guitars
 Bob Moore – double bass
 Hank Garland – bass guitar
 D. J. Fontana, Buddy Harman – drums, percussion
 Floyd Cramer, Gordon Stoker – piano
 Boots Randolph – claves

References

External links
Songs by Doc Pomus.

Elvis Presley songs
Songs with music by Mort Shuman
Songs with lyrics by Doc Pomus
1961 singles
UK Singles Chart number-one singles
1961 songs